Cinnamomum citriodorum is a species of flowering plant in the family Lauraceae. It is endemic to Western Ghats and Sri Lanka. It is commonly known as Malabar Cinnamon. It has a characteristic smell of lemon grass. C. citriodorum has 45% Cinnamaldehyde compared to 80% for C. cassia.

References

citriodorum
Endemic flora of Sri Lanka
Endangered plants
Plants described in 1861